Arrowhead Nunatak is a long, narrow nunatak  southeast of Sullivan Nunatak near the head of Nimrod Glacier. It was mapped and so named by the northern party of the New Zealand Geological Survey Antarctic Expedition (1960–61) because in plan it resembles an arrowhead.

References 

Nunataks of Oates Land